Kapelle-Biezelinge is a railway station located in Kapelle and near the housing area of Biezelinge, The Netherlands. The station was opened on 1 July 1868 and is located on the Roosendaal–Vlissingen railway. The train service is operated by Nederlandse Spoorwegen.

Destinations

The following major destination is possible from Kapelle-Biezelinge:

Vlissingen, Middelburg, Goes, Bergen op Zoom and Roosendaal.

Train service
The following services currently call at Kapelle-Biezelinge:
2x per hour intercity service Amsterdam - Haarlem - Leiden - The Hague - Rotterdam - Dordrecht - Roosendaal - Vlissingen

Bus service

References

External links
NS website 
Dutch Public Transport journey planner 

Railway stations in Zeeland
Railway stations opened in 1868
Railway stations on the Staatslijn F
Kapelle